Mirlan Mirzaliev  is a retired professional Kyrgyzstani footballer.

He is also a former Kyrgyzstan national football team player.

References

Kyrgyzstani footballers
Kyrgyzstan international footballers
Living people
1974 births
Association footballers not categorized by position